The Torrejonian North American Stage on the geologic timescale is the North American  faunal stage according to the North American Land Mammal Ages chronology (NALMA), typically set from 63,300,000 to 60,200,000 years BP lasting . 

It is usually considered to overlap the Selandian and Thanetian within the Paleocene. 

The Torrejonian is preceded by the Puercan and followed by the Tiffanian NALMA stages.

The Torrejonian is considered to be contained within the Danian and contains the following substages:
To3: Lower boundary source of the base of the Torrejonian (approximate).
To2: Lower boundary source of the base of the Torrejonian (approximate) and upper boundary source of the base of the Selandian (approximate).
To1: Upper boundary source (61.7 Ma) of the base of the Selandian (approximate).

References

 

 
Paleocene life
Paleocene animals of North America